, provisional designation  with cometary number 362P, is a Jupiter family comet in a quasi-Hilda orbit within the outermost regions of the asteroid belt. It was discovered on 8 April 2008, by astronomers of the Spacewatch program at Kitt Peak National Observatory near Tucson, Arizona, in the United States.

Orbit and classification 
 is classified as a member of the dynamical Hilda group, as well as a Jupiter family that shows clear cometary activity, which has also been described as a "quasi-Hilda comet". Orbital backward integration suggests that it might have been a centaur or trans-Neptunian object that ended its dynamical evolution as a quasi-Hilda comet. It may have reached the belt during the last few hundred years.

It orbits the Sun in the outer asteroid belt at a distance of 2.9–5.1 AU once every 7 years and 11 months (2,883 days; semi-major axis of 3.96 AU). Its orbit has an eccentricity of 0.28 and an inclination of 16° with respect to the ecliptic. The body's observation arc begins with a precovery taken by the Sloan Digital Sky Survey in October 2001, more than  5 years prior to its official discovery observation by Spacewatch.

Although  orbits in the asteroid belt, it has a Jupiter Tisserand's parameter (TJ) of 2.926, just below Jewitt's threshold of 3, which serves as a distinction between the main-belt asteroids (TJ larger than 3) and the Jupiter-family comets (TJ between 2 and 3).

Numbering and naming 

This minor planet was numbered by the Minor Planet Center on 16 February 2016. As of 2020, it has not been named.

Physical characteristics 

 is an assumed C-type asteroid.

Rotation period 

Lightcurve analysis gave a rotation period of  hours with a small brightness amplitude of 0.12 magnitude.

Diameter and albedo 

The Collaborative Asteroid Lightcurve Link assumes a standard albedo for a carbonaceous body of 0.057 and calculates a diameter of 14.64 kilometers based on an absolute magnitude of 12.9. Other estimates, taking into account several published magnitude measurements and a large range of albedo assumptions, estimate a diameter range of 5.5 to 24.7 kilometers.

Notes

References

External links 
 COMETARY ACTIVITY IN (457175) 2008 GO98, Minor Planet Electronic Circular, Minor Planet Center
 It's an Asteroid, It's a Comet, It's... well, Both for Now!, Catalina Sky Survey, Lunar and Planetary Laboratory
 Cometary activity in (457175) 2008 GO98, The Virual Telescope, 23 August 2017
 Asteroid Lightcurve Database (LCDB), query form (info )
 Discovery Circumstances: Numbered Minor Planets (455001)-(460000) – Minor Planet Center
 
 

457175
0362
457175
20080408